Fran Cirian  was a politician of the 17th century in Slovenia, when the country was under the Holy Roman Empire. He became mayor of Ljubljana in 1647. He was succeeded by Ljudevit Schonleben in 1648.

References

Mayors of places in the Holy Roman Empire
Mayors of Ljubljana
Year of birth missing
Year of death missing
17th-century Slovenian politicians